"Following the Sun" is a 2003 song created by the German band Enigma. The single was the second released from their fifth album, Voyageur.

Track listing
 "Following the Sun" (Radio Edit) – 4:19
 "Following the Sun" (Album Version) – 5:47
 "Voyageur" (Fab 4 Mix) – 4:31

Charts

References

2003 singles
2003 songs
Enigma (German band) songs
Song recordings produced by Michael Cretu
Songs written by Michael Cretu
Songs written by Jens Gad
Virgin Records singles